Doce de Mãe is a Brazilian comedy-drama television series starring Fernanda Montenegro.

The series is a co-production of Globo and Casa de Cinema de Porto Alegre, an independent production company. For her performance in the role of Picucha, Fernanda Montenegro was nominated to International Emmy Award for Best Actress. In 2013, Montenegro won the Award by the same role in the special shown in 2012, which gave rise to the series of the same name.

Plot 
Picucha (Fernanda Montenegro) may seem old-fashioned, but she has modern ideas and a great sense of humor. As the matriarch of a big family, she is involved in the daily lives of her children, grandchildren and other relatives. Undeterred by the typical problems of old age, she uses her many years of experience to solve problems in the best way possible. 
 
Her children are becoming less and less comfortable with the fact that she still lives alone in the house at her age. However, it is Picucha herself who surprises everyone when she makes the spontaneous decision to move to a nursing home.  
 
She revolutionizes her new home by organizing gambling and concerts. It is there that she also has an idea about how to help her unemployed son—start a business that resells the benefits normally reserved for the elderly, such as parking places and preferential customer service. However, despite her lively lifestyle there, Picucha decides to leave the home and return to her family, thereby starting a sequence of living at her children's houses. 
 
In addition to all of these activities, this indefatigable woman still needs to address other issues such as the suspicion that her late husband had a daughter out of wedlock. She not only solves the mystery but also discovers that she feels a motherly love for the young girl.

Cast

Main  
 Fernanda Montenegro as Maria Izabel "Picucha" de Souza
 Marco Ricca as Silvio de Souza
 Louise Cardoso as Elaine de Souza
 Matheus Nachtergaele as Fernando de Souza
 Mariana Lima as Suzana de Souza
 Daniel de Oliveira as Jesus Medeiros
 Drica Moraes as Rosalinda Bauer

Recurring  
 Francisco Cuoco as Toninho and Fortunato
 Otávio Augusto as Júlio
 Emiliano Queiroz as Alfredinho
 Elisa Volpatto as Carolina
 Letícia Sampaio as Isaurinha
 Áurea Baptista as Florinha
 Camilla Amado as Dora
 Tarcísio Filho as Alberto
 Irene Brietzke as Carlinda
 Wandi Doratiotto as Flávio
 Evandro Soldatelli as Roberto

Guest 
 Sophie Charlotte as Ritinha
 Lázaro Ramos as Francis Farme
 Augusto Madeira as Gilberto
 Sérgio Mamberti as Chatonildo
 Armando Babaioff as Artur

Awards

See too 
 Doce de Mãe (TV movie)

References

External links 
Official website
 

2014 Brazilian television series debuts
2014 Brazilian television series endings
Rede Globo original programming
Portuguese-language television shows
Brazilian comedy television series
International Emmy Award for best comedy series winners